Pembroke College Boat Club may refer to:

 Pembroke College Boat Club (Cambridge)
 Pembroke College Boat Club (Oxford)